Equatorial Guinea competed at the 2019 World Aquatics Championships in Gwangju, South Korea from 12 to 28 July 2019.

Swimming

Equatorial Guinea entered three swimmers.

Men

Women

References

Nations at the 2019 World Aquatics Championships
Equatorial Guinea at the World Aquatics Championships
World Aquatics Championships